The 1961 Baltimore Colts season was the ninth for the team in the National Football League. They finished the  season with a record of 8 wins and 6 losses, tied for third in the Western Conference with the Chicago Bears.

Upset by the expansion Minnesota Vikings on November 12, the Colts dipped to 4–5; they won four of the last five to finish with a winning record.

Roster

Regular season

Schedule

Standings

References

See also 
 History of the Indianapolis Colts
 Indianapolis Colts seasons
 Colts–Patriots rivalry

Baltimore Colts
1961
Baltimore Colts